Namiq Nasrulla oğlu Nasrullayev (2 February 1945 – 17 January 2023) was an Azerbaijani mathematician and politician. He served as Minister of Economy from 1996 to 2001 and chairman of the Chamber of Accounts from 2001 to 2007.

Nasrullayev died in Baku on 17 January 2023, at the age of 77.

References

1945 births
2023 deaths
Government ministers of Azerbaijan
Azerbaijani mathematicians
Azerbaijani politicians
Azerbaijani scientists
Azerbaijan State Oil and Industry University alumni
Moscow State University alumni